Zinura Djuraeva (born September 26, 1985) is an Uzbekistani judoka, who played for the extra and half lightweight categories. She won the bronze medal for the 48 kg class at the 2003 Asian Judo Championships in Jeju City, South Korea.

Djuraeva represented Uzbekistan at the 2008 Summer Olympics in Beijing, where she competed for the women's half-lightweight class (52 kg). She lost the first preliminary match to Germany's Romy Tarangul, who successfully scored an ippon and a hadaka-jime (naked strangle), twelve seconds before the five-minute period had ended.

References

External links

NBC 2008 Olympics profile 

Uzbekistani female judoka
Living people
Uzbeks
Olympic judoka of Uzbekistan
Judoka at the 2008 Summer Olympics
1985 births
Judoka at the 2002 Asian Games
Judoka at the 2006 Asian Games
Asian Games competitors for Uzbekistan